Mir Khan (also Romanized as Mīr Khān, Mīghān, and Mīr Khūn) is a village in Momenabad Rural District, in the Central District of Sarbisheh County, South Khorasan Province, Iran. At the 2006 census, its population was 49, in 11 families.

References 

Populated places in Sarbisheh County